Adam Pallin, also known by his stage name 1-900, is an American record producer, songwriter and multi-instrumentalist. He was the producer/programmer half of the pop duo Little Jackie with Imani Coppola. His production and songwriting often blend quirky, vintage aesthetic with cleverly crafted pop.

In 2013, he teamed up with Zoe Silverman to form ASTR, releasing debut EP Varsity on Neon Gold.

Production credits

Albums
The Stoop – Little Jackie (2008) – S-Curve (July 8, 2008) – Parlophone
Varsity – ASTR (2014) – Neon Gold Records (January 7, 2014) – Neon Gold

Singles
Little Jackie – "The World Should Revolve Around Me" (2008) – UK #14
Little Jackie – "The Stoop" (2008)
Chiddy Bang – "Ray Charles" (2011) – UK #13
Ingrid Michaelson – "Afterlife" (2014)
Joey Badass – "Teach Me (featuring Kiesza)" (2015)
Joey Badass – "Devastated" (2016)

References

External links
 Little Jackie
 ASTR
 
 

Living people
Record producers from New York (state)
Musicians from New York City
Year of birth missing (living people)